Bell Mountain is a mountain in the Paloma Valley near Menifee in Riverside County, California.

References

Peninsular Ranges
Mountains of Riverside County, California
Mountains of Southern California